This article lists the speakers of the Grand National Assembly of Turkey. The name of the parliament of the Republic of Turkey, originally and currently the Grand National Assembly of Turkey since its establishment on 23 April 1920, has for short periods been changed.

A Senate also existed besides the National Assembly between 1960 and 1980.

List of speakers

See also
 Senate of the Republic
 List of chairmen of the Senate of Turkey

References
 Grand National Assembly of Turkey official website 
 Turkish ministries, etc – Rulers.org

Turkey
 
Speakers of Parliament